Radio Freedom were an Australian dance band, which were active in the early 1990s. They had a top ten hit with their single "I Can Feel It" (1992). Band members were Paul "Pehl" Snashall, Brett "True" O'Hara and Ralph Alvaro  The group supported a tour by Elton John in 1993 and issued an album, Beyond the Peach Tree, before disbanding in 1994.

History 

In November 1991 Radio Freedom were formed in Sydney as a duo by Brett "True" O'Hara on turntables and Paul "Pehl" Snashall on lead vocals, guitar and keyboards. O'Hara was a local DJ while Snashall had completed an audio engineering degree before becoming a bass guitarist in a grunge band. Snashall then played lead guitar in a pop group and keyboards in covers band. Their debut single, "I Can Feel It", appeared in May 1992, which peaked at No. 7 on the ARIA Singles chart. It was co-written by O'Hara and Snashall with Miguel Montoya. The Canberra Times Charles Miranda described its sonation, "'90s funk, Latin American Salsa with a little calypso island feel thrown in for good measure."

"I Can Feel It" had been played on TV series, E Street, which was organised by their label, Westside Records through their same parent company, Westside Television Productions. Their second single, "Proove", appeared in August and reached No. 30, which was written by O'Hara and Snashall. Radio Freedom issued their debut album, Beyond the Peach Tree, via Westside/Phonogram. By that time they were a three-piece with Ralpha Alvaro joining on lead guitar. Nicole Leedham of The Canberra Times felt it was "not too bad. Admittedly, [the band] is never going to win a prize for profundity but this debut album is, at least, pretty groovy."

Their third single, in February 1993, is a cover version of Bob Marley's "Is This Love". Early in that year the group supported an Australian tour by Elton John. John informed Snashall that Westside had bloocked plans for Radio Freedom to continue John's tour beyond Australia and that their label was insolvent. The group disbanded in 1994. In June 2022 Snashall revealed the band's problems with Westside in a podcast, A Journey Through Aussie Pop, "Episode 9: Radio Freedom with Paul Snashall."

Members

Credits:
Brett "True" O'Hara – turntables, scratches, loops
Paul "Pehl" Snashall – lead vocals, guitar, keyboards
Ralph Alvaro – lead guitar

Discography

Albums

Singles

References

New South Wales musical groups
Musical groups established in 1991
Musical groups disestablished in 1994